Angela Winstanley-Smith (born 5 August 1985) is a British water polo player, and coach.

She competed for Great Britain in the women's tournament in the

2012 Summer Olympics. This was the first ever Olympic GB women's water polo team. She competed at the 2013 World Aquatics Championships.

She is the head coach of the New Zealand Women's Water Polo team, at the 2017 World Aquatics Championships.

She was appointed after taking the Marist Magic to back to back New Zealand titles. This included an undefeated season in 2016.

References

External links
 

1985 births
Living people
British female water polo players
Olympic water polo players of Great Britain
Water polo players at the 2012 Summer Olympics
British water polo coaches
New Zealand women's national water polo team coaches